Tasbandi (also Romanized as Ţāsbandī) is a village in Tork-e Gharbi Rural District, Jowkar District, Malayer County, Hamadan Province, Iran. At the 2006 census, its population was 554, in 130 families.

References 

Populated places in Malayer County